John Middleton (born 7 September 1953) is an English actor, known for his role as caring and sympathetic Rev. Ashley Thomas in the ITV soap opera Emmerdale. Middleton remained in the role from 1996 to 2017 and with a brief return in 2018 for two episodes.

Career
He has appeared in many other TV programmes, including Cracker "Men Should Weep" and most notably in 1993 as John Hargreaves in Coronation Street, the man who knocked down and killed Lisa Duckworth. Two years later he appeared again in Coronation Street, this time as a hospital consultant, when Deirdre Barlow's late husband Samir Rachid was beaten up and killed by a gang of thugs.

His first Emmerdale role was that of PC John Jarvis at the time of the Post Office raid in 1994, before landing the role of the caring and sympathetic Rev. Ashley Thomas in December 1996. In October 2015, when a new storyline was revealed on-screen for Ashley, it was also announced Middleton would be leaving his role as Ashley after 20 years. Middleton's contract ended in March 2017 and Ashley died on 7 April 2017.

ITV have released a promo for a set of episode from 3 April 2017 through to 7 April 2017 titled "It's Time To Say Goodbye". It features many pictures of Ashley and his Family and Friends. Ashley slowly starts fading away from the photos.

Before appearing in both Coronation Street and Emmerdale, Middleton was seen in an early 90s UK TV advertisement for Swinton Insurance. In October 2021, Middleton portrayed the role of Feargal Lumsden in an episode of the BBC soap opera Doctors.

References

External links
 

English male soap opera actors
Male actors from Bradford
Labour Party (UK) people
1953 births
Living people